Brett James Cornelius (born June 5, 1968) is an American country music singer, songwriter, and record producer based in Nashville. James' compositions have been credited on 494 recordings by a wide variety of artists. Signed to Career Records (a division of Arista Nashville) as a solo artist in 1995, James charted three singles and released a self-titled debut album that year.  He returned to Arista as a recording artist in 2002, releasing two more singles.

Since the early 2000s, James has become known primarily as a songwriter for other country and pop music artists. Among his compositions is Carrie Underwood's 2006 number-one hit "Jesus, Take the Wheel", which received Grammy Awards for Best Country Song and Best Female Country Vocal Performance. His writers' credits also include number-one hits for Jessica Andrews, Martina McBride, Kenny Chesney, Rodney Atkins, and Jason Aldean.

Singing career
James was born in Columbia, Missouri; his father was a physician, Dr. Sam Cornelius and his mother was Carolyn. James graduated from Christian Heritage Academy high-school in Del City, Oklahoma in 1986.  He attended Baylor University, pledged Sigma Chi Fraternity, and graduated in 1991 with a Bachelor of Science Degree.  He attended medical school for a time in the early 1990s, but dropped out to pursue a musical career as a recording artist on Career Records, a subsidiary of Arista Nashville, in 1995. That year, he released his self-titled debut album, which included the charting singles "Female Bonding," "If I Could See Love" and "Worth the Fall." Also included on this album was "Wake Up and Smell the Whiskey", which was co-written and later released as a single by Dean Miller in 1997.

In addition, he appeared on two compilation albums issued by Arista Nashville. The first of these was 1996's Star of Wonder: A Country Christmas, on which he sang "What Child Is This?", and the other was a country-gospel album entitled Peace in the Valley, to which he contributed a recording of "What a Friend We Have in Jesus." This latter album was also promoted via a special on The Nashville Network (TNN), now Spike. In 1998, James and Tammy Graham were both dropped from Career Records when it merged with Arista Nashville.

James returned to his singing career in the early 2000s. After declining to join the band Sixwire, he re-signed with Arista Nashville and began working with producer Dann Huff. Although he twice charted in the Top 40 of the Hot Country Songs charts with "Chasing Amy" and "After All," he never released a full album.

Songwriting career
In 1998, James was at a low point: he had left medical school at the University of Oklahoma after one year to go to Nashville to make a career, but after nine months of waiting tables and attending many open mic nights, he had not had much success, and he was dropped from his recording and publishing deals. James thought he was in the wrong business, according to entertainment writer David Ross. James met with Producer Mark Bright who agreed to sign him for very little money to Bright's new publishing company, "Teracel Music", as its first and only writer. SIx weeks into the agreement, James was re-accepted to medical school and decided to go back. Bright asked him if he would continue to write songs anyway, to satisfy the one-year agreement, and James promised to write every third day. He kept his promise, later saying, "It was a big creative shift—letting go of the dream of being a big star and just trying to write some cool music." He wrote many songs including "Jesus, Take the Wheel" and "Cowboy Casanova" for Teracel, and his songs were recorded by artists such as Faith Hill, Kenny Chesney, Tim McGraw, Jason Aldean, Jessica Andrews, Martina McBride and later Carrie Underwood. Within the year's contract with Teracel, James had a hot streak of 33 songs to be recorded by major artists. In 2000, James quit school for a final time. The dean of the medical school agreed with James that his success as a songwriter was undeniable and wished him well, saying, "You have to go and do this ... but you can't ever come back".

His singles for other artists in the early 2000s included the number-one hits "Who I Am" by Jessica Andrews and "Blessed" by Martina McBride. He continued to write for other artists, with two more of his songs topping the charts: "When the Sun Goes Down" by Kenny Chesney and Uncle Kracker, and "Jesus, Take the Wheel" by Carrie Underwood, in 2004 and 2006 respectively. "Jesus, Take the Wheel" also won a Grammy Award for Best Female Country Vocal Performance and Best Country Song, the latter of which was awarded to James and the song's other two songwriters. Rodney Atkins' "It's America", Chesney's "Out Last Night" and Carrie Underwood's "Cowboy Casanova", all co-written by James, also topped the country charts in 2009. In 2010 James charted number one with Jason Aldean's "The Truth" and Chris Young's "The Man I Want to Be". ASCAP named James their country songwriter of the year in 2006 and again in 2010. Non-country artists who have recorded his works include Kelly Clarkson, Backstreet Boys, Bon Jovi and Paulina Rubio. James also co-wrote American Idol season 10 winner Scotty McCreery's debut single "I Love You This Big".

In 2008, James also began working as a record producer, with his production credits including Gracin's We Weren't Crazy, Kristy Lee Cook's Why Wait, a re-release of Taylor Swift's self-titled debut album, Jessica Simpson's Do You Know and Kip Moore's Up All Night.

Songs written by Brett James

James' songwriting credits include twenty six Number One hits. Besides these, he has co-written several other Top 10 country hits, including cuts by Rascal Flatts, Josh Gracin, Sara Evans, Tim McGraw, and others.

Discography

Albums

Singles

Notes
A^ "Female Bonding" also peaked at number 89 on the RPM Country Tracks chart in Canada.

Music videos

References

External links

1968 births
American country singer-songwriters
American country record producers
Arista Nashville artists
Grammy Award winners
Living people
Musicians from Columbia, Missouri
Place of birth missing (living people)
University of Oklahoma alumni
Country musicians from Missouri
Businesspeople from Columbia, Missouri
Singer-songwriters from Missouri